was the eighth of ten s, and the second to be built for the Imperial Japanese Navy under the Circle Two Program (Maru Ni Keikaku).

History
Despite being one of the most powerful classes of destroyers in the world at the time of their completion, none survived the Pacific War.

Yamakaze, built at the Uraga Dock Company was laid down on 25 May 1935, launched on 21 February 1936 and commissioned on 30 June 1937.

Operational history
From January 1942, Yamakaze participated in operations in the Netherlands East Indies, including the invasion of Tarakan Island, where she assisted in sinking the Royal Dutch Navy minelayer . She later covered landings at Balikpapan and Makassar, sinking the submarine  in the Makassar Strait with her guns on 11 February. After participating in the invasion of eastern Java, Yamakaze engaged a group of Allied destroyers during the Battle of the Java Sea, and was credited with assisting in the sinking of the American destroyer , the British cruiser  and destroyer .

In April, Yamakaze assisted in the invasion of Panay and Negros in the Philippines. From 10 May, Yamakaze was reassigned to the IJN 1st Fleet and returned to Sasebo Naval Arsenal for repairs at the end of the month.

During the Battle of Midway on 4–6 June, Yamakaze was part of the Aleutians Guard Force under Admiral Shirō Takasu.

Notes

References

External links

Shiratsuyu-class destroyers
World War II destroyers of Japan
Shipwrecks in the Philippine Sea
Ships built by Uraga Dock Company
Ships sunk by American submarines
1936 ships
Maritime incidents in June 1942
Ships lost with all hands